Torroella de Montgrí is a coastal municipality on the Costa Brava, and small town in Catalonia, Spain. The town lies on the north bank of the Ter river, a few kilometres before it flows into the Mediterranean. The beach resort of L'Estartit also is part of the municipality, as are the Medes Islands and a large part of the Montgrí Massif.

It lies on the junction of the C-31 and GI-641. The town was originally the Royal Port for the Kings of Aragon before the river started silting up and a new port was founded at l'Estartit. The town retains its medieval core and walls and hosts a market every Monday.

The town is towered over by the Montgrí Massif on its northern side. The Montgrí is a long mountain formation that looks like a sleeping bishop seen from afar. Its vegetation consists mostly of low Mediterranean scrub among rocks.

The town is a staging point on the GR 92 long distance footpath, which roughly follows the length of the Mediterranean coast of Spain.

Gallery

References

External links

Town Council Website
 Government data pages 

Municipalities in Baix Empordà
Populated places in Baix Empordà